Amaradakki is a village in the Avudaiyarkoil revenue block of Pudukkottai district, Tamil Nadu, India. And it will comes under Aranthangi legislative assembly. Also dominated by both of the Dravidian parties. In 1960’s many of social reformations took place in these area. Appukutty and Siluvai Muthu are notable communist activists at that time. Also siluvai muthu still remembering for his sacrificial death by surrounded area Dalits . Kanoor , kasiyarmadam villages are located as boundary .(source:Kizhanrthezhuhirathu Kizhakku Mukhavai)

Population 

As per the 2001 census, Amaradakki has a total population of  650 with 341 males and 309 females. Out of the total population, 399 people are literate.

References

Villages in Pudukkottai district